Yelanysh (Yılanış) is a rural locality (a selo) in Meshchegarovsky Selsoviet, Salavatsky District, Bashkortostan, Russia. The population was 343 as of 2010. There are 7 streets.

Geography 
Yelanysh is located 30 km north of Maloyaz (the district's administrative centre) by road. Kadyrovo is the nearest rural locality.

References 

Rural localities in Salavatsky District